The aortic bifurcation is the point at which the abdominal aorta bifurcates (forks) into the left and right common iliac arteries. The aortic bifurcation is usually seen at the level of L4, just above the junction of the left and right common iliac veins.

The right common iliac artery passes in front of the left common iliac vein. In some individual, mainly women with lumbar lordosis this vein can be compressed between the vertebra and the artery. This is the so-called Cockett syndrome or May–Thurner syndrome can cause a slower venous flow and the possibility of deep venous thrombosis in the left leg mainly in pregnancy.

In surface anatomy, the bifurcation approximately corresponds to the umbilicus.

Additional images

References

bifurcation
Abdomen